The Lee Art Theater was an adult film theater located on 934 W Grace Street, Richmond, Virginia, United States, that ran from 1965-1993. It is known as Richmond's first adult theater, and featured burlesque dancers in its later years.  The theater closed in 1993, was bought and reopened by Virginia Commonwealth University, was renamed the Grace Street Theater, and is now used for the Universities Dance program.

Opening
The theater, originally the Lee Theater, named after the Confederate general Robert E. Lee, opened on October 13th, 1935 and had seating for 588. The opening night program stated it was built "in anticipation of scientific entertainment, miracles of the present and future, talking pictures, and other developments, [that] future generations will know and enjoy." The first showing was of China Seas. At this time it was a second-run movie theater that showed family-oriented MGM movies. The Lee Theatre was designed by Richmond architect Henry Carl Messerschmidt in an Art Deco style. By 1950, it was operated by Fabian Theatres chain who closed it in 1963. Its final showing was Carry On Teacher.

It reopened on October 23, 1965 as the renamed Lee Art Theatre with Jayne Mansfield in “Promises, Promises” (the uncut European version) & Kenneth More in “Loss of Innocence”. It screened adult films and this continued until closing in 1993. .

Opening as an art house
The theater was remodeled and reopened as the Lee Art Theater in September 1965. It opened with the intention of being an art house, showing mostly foreign films. A personal account explains the Lee Art Theater's marketing as stating, "The programmer was clearly targeting couples with a guilty pleasure as bait but offering a respectable or even critically acclaimed title to validate their attendance." The theater used adult programs as a way to keep people interested in the art house.

Richmond's first porn theater
Without the public desire for foreign films, the theater soon began playing soft-core porn movies such as The Girl From S.I.N and Olga's Dance Hall GirlsThe theater even played the huge hit Deep Throat, which helped launch the porn chic movement of the 1970s. Lines formed around the block for the showings of this film. By 1971, it was calling itself "Richmond's first adult theater", and in 1975 it added burlesque dancers.

Lee Art Theater, Inc v. Virginia
Several films were confiscated from the Lee Art Theater by the Richmond police department for obscenity, one of which was Angelique in Black Leather.These movies were taken in violation of Title 18.1-228 Code of Virginia. They were taken without a warrant, and the theater took the case to the Supreme Court of Appeals of Virginia, where the case was refused. The case was then brought to the Supreme Court and on June 17th, 1968 the films were determined to have been taken unconstitutionally.

Grace Street Theater
After the Supreme Court case, the Lee Art Theater continued to run as an adult theater until it closed in 1993. With the rise of home videos, the need for an adult theater decreased. The theater was then bought by Virginia Commonwealth University and remodeled. In February 1996 the theater reopened, was renamed the Grace Street Theater, and is currently still in use for the university's dance program.

References

Theatres in Richmond, Virginia
Theatres in Virginia